Suricata is a genus of mongoose that is endemic to Africa. The oldest species known is the extinct Suricata major that lived about 1.8 million years ago in South Africa.

References

Mammal genera
Mammal genera with one living species
Taxa named by Anselme Gaëtan Desmarest
Mongooses